Leading Ladies is a short 2D animated podcast originating from Zambia. The podcast was first released on YouTube, Facebook, and LinkedIn on March 27th, 2019. The podcast focuses on the lives of significant African women who held leadership positions between the 17th and 19th century The primary objective of the podcast is to shed light on the obscured and often hidden stories of Zambian women who have held significant leadership roles throughout history.

The Women's History Museum in Zambia and Hivos Southern Africa Region jointly produce the animated podcast. The podcast's stories are set across Zambia's 10 provinces and were sourced from the National Archives of Zambia. The podcast's first season was written by Mulenga Kapwepwe and Samba Yonga and premiered on March 27th, 2019. It explored the lives of women who made important but often untold contributions to Zambia's history during the pre-colonial era.

The podcast's second season, which premiered on September 16th, 2020, presents more contemporary accounts of Zambian leading ladies. The podcast serves as a means of educating and inspiring audiences on the significant impact of women's leadership in Zambia's history.

Seasons

Season one 
The debut season featured women from the pre-colonial era who have made important but largely untold contributions to Zambia's history.

Season two 
Season two is focus on the post-colonial narrative of women's leadership that has not been fully explored. The second season of the series start airing on 16 September 2020 on the museum's online platforms. The web series will be free and available for everyone to access.

References

External links 
 Women Museum Zambia

2019 podcast debuts
Animated web series
History of Zambia
Feminist podcasts